The Big Picture is a collaborative album by Michael Shrieve and David Beal, released in 1988 through Fortuna Records.

Track listing

Personnel
Andrew Aturmer – acoustic guitar
David Beal – musician, production
Catanzaro – photography
Mahdessian – photography
Jeffrey Norman – engineering
Paul Orofino – engineering
John Rollo – engineering
Mark Senasac – engineering
Michael Shrieve – musician, production

References

External links 
 

1988 albums